Gliese 357 d is an exoplanet, considered to be a "Super-Earth" within the circumstellar habitable zone of its parent star. The planet orbits GJ 357, 31 light-years from the Solar System,  The system is part of the Hydra constellation. 

The planet was discovered by the TESS team and announced in July 2019. The data confirming the presence of the planet was uncovered in ground based observation dating back to 1998 while confirming the TESS detection of GJ 357 b, a “hot earth” that orbits much closer to the parent star. Even though GJ 357d is 20% closer to GJ 357 than Earth is to the Sun, GJ 357 is much smaller than the Sun. So it receives as much energy as Mars. As a result it is estimated the average temperature is -64°F (-53°C) but this temperature is survivable for humans, if there is a thick enough atmosphere the actual temperature could be much higher. If humans traveled there using modern spacecraft, it would take them about 660,000 years to get there. The planet is 6 times more massive than Earth and twice Earth's size.

References  

Exoplanets detected by radial velocity
Super-Earths
Exoplanets discovered in 2019
Hydra (constellation)
Super-Earths in the habitable zone
Exoplanets discovered by TESS